Batu Apoi Forest Reserve is located in Batu Apoi in the Temburong District of Brunei. The Ulu Temburong National Park is located within the reserve. Its mountains reach altitudes of  around its southeastern borders. The region features the shale lithology known as Setap Shale, and sometimes as Temburong Formation. River channels, V-shaped valleys, and mixed Dipterocarp rainforest also characterize the forest reserve.

References

Protected areas of Brunei
Forest reserves